Stanley Baldwin received numerous honours in recognition of his career in politics. These included:

Hereditary Peerage
Baldwin was elevated to the House of Lords on 8 June 1937, upon his standing down as Leader of the Conservative Party and from his seat in the House of Commons. He Took the Title Earl Baldwin of Bewdley, with the Subsidiary title of Viscount Corvedale, of Corvedale in the County of Salop. He sat with the Conservative Party Benches.

Coat of arms

Commonwealth honours

Commonwealth Realms

Decorations and medals

Foreign honours

Other distinctions

Scholastic

 University Degrees

 Chancellor, visitor, governor, rector and fellowships

Honorary Degrees

Memberships and fellowships

Freedom of the City

  15 November 1923: Worcester.
  13 March 1925: Leeds.
  8 August 1925: Bewdley.
  5 October 1925: Glasgow.
  14 June 1926: Edinburgh.
  1928: Aberystwyth

Places named after Baldwin

 (British Columbia) Mount Stanley Baldwin (1927).

References

Stanley Baldwin
Baldwin, Stanley
Baldwin, Stanley